Lovebox Live Tour is the second live CD by singer Beni. The album contains a bonus song named "ONLY ONE" and is the insert song for the movie "ランウェイ☆ビート" (Runway Beat). This release also contains a DVD that contains live footage of Beni's tour on 4 November 2010 in Zepp Tokyo hall.

Track list: DVD

Track list: CD

Charts

References

Albums recorded at Zepp Tokyo
Beni (singer) albums
2011 live albums
2011 video albums
Live video albums